Phosphopyruvate dehydrogenase phosphatase may refer to:
 (pyruvate dehydrogenase (acetyl-transferring))-phosphatase, an enzyme
 Phosphoprotein phosphatase, an enzyme